Love in May (German: Liebe im Mai) is a 1928 Austrian silent film directed by Robert Wohlmuth and starring Wolf Albach-Retty, Betty Astor and Igo Sym.

The film's sets were designed by the art directors Artur Berger and Emil Stepanek.

Cast
In alphabetical order
 Wolf Albach-Retty
 Betty Astor
 Oscar Beregi Sr.
 Eugen Guenther
 Hanni Hoess
 Hans Junkermann
 Igo Sym
 Hugo Thimig

References

Bibliography
 Roman Dziergwa. Am Vorabend des Grauens: Studien zum Spannungsfeld Politik, Literatur, Film in Deutschland und Polen in den 30er Jahren des 20. Jahrhunderts. 2005.

External links

1928 films
Austrian silent feature films
Films directed by Robert Wohlmuth
Austrian black-and-white films